James Worts (c. 1792 – February 18, 1834) was one of the co-founders of the Gooderham and Worts partnership which, after his death, evolved from a simple mill into a prosperous distilling company which eventual become the largest in the world.

Worts was born in Bungay Parish, Suffolk, England to William Worts and Mary Murfield.

Having first constructed a flour mill in his hometown in Suffolk, England, he eventually moved to York, Upper Canada with his eldest son, James Gooderham Worts in 1831. Once there, he set up another windmill which was completed in 1832.

In February 1834, several weeks after his wife Elizabeth Gooderham, sister of his partner and brother-in-law William Gooderham Sr., died during childbirth, James Worts committed suicide by drowning himself in a well on his own company's property.

References

1792 births
1834 deaths
Businesspeople from Toronto
Suicides in Ontario
Suicides by drowning in Canada
English emigrants to pre-Confederation Ontario
People from Suffolk (before 1974)